Sikandarpur Sarausi is a community development block in Unnao tehsil of Unnao district, Uttar Pradesh, India. It consists of 96 rural villages, with a total population of 185,779 people.

Historically, there was a pargana of Sarosi, which was created during the reign of Akbar in the 1500s. The pargana was later renamed Sikandarpur after another one of its main villages; C.A. Elliott wrote in 1862 that the name change had "recently become habitual" then.

The present block was inaugurated on 1 October 1961 in order to oversee implementation of India's Five-Year Plans at a local and rural level. It was one of two blocks in the district (the other being Safipur) that was selected for implementation of the applied nutrition programme. Sikandarpur, the old pargana's namesake, was chosen as the block headquarters.

Demographics 
As of 2011, Sikandarpur Sarausi CD block has a population of 185,779 people, in 36,202 households. This population includes 98,687 males and 87,092 females. The corresponding sex ratio of 883 females to every 1000 males is lower than the district rural average of 906. About 14.4% of the block's population is in the 0-6 age group as of 2011. The sex ratio of this group is 931, which is higher than the rural average of 923 for Unnao district. Members of Scheduled Castes make up 26.5% of the block's population, the lowest proportion among the district's 16 CD blocks, and members of Scheduled Tribes make up 0.02%. The literacy rate of Sikandarpur Sarausi block is 61.9% (counting only people age 7 and up); literacy is higher among men and boys (70.0%) than among women and girls (52.6%). Among Scheduled Castes, the literacy rate is 55.2% — 63.6% among men and boys, and 45.7% among women and girls. The 17.8% gender literacy gap among this group is the lowest among the blocks in Unnao district.

In terms of employment, 24.9% of Sikandarpur Sarausi block residents were classified as main workers (i.e. people employed for at least 6 months per year) in 2011. Marginal workers (i.e. people employed for less than 6 months per year) made up 11.2%, and the remaining 63.9% were non-workers. Employment status varied significantly according to gender, with 52.9% of men being either main or marginal workers, compared to only 17.0% of women.

Agriculture is the predominant source of employment in Sikandarpur Sarausi block: 36.6% of the block's workers were cultivators who owned or leased their own land as of 2011, and a further 32.1% were agricultural labourers who worked someone else's land for wages. Another 3.8% were counted as household industry workers, and the remaining 27.5% were other workers.

Villages 
Sikandarpur Sarausi CD block has the following 96 villages:

References

Unnao district
Community development blocks in India